Classico is the third studio album by the Italian rapper Bassi Maestro, released in 2000 under Area Cronica.

Track listing

Link 

2000 albums
Bassi Maestro albums